The 2015–16 Monmouth Hawks men's basketball team represented Monmouth University during the 2015–16 NCAA Division I men's basketball season. The Hawks, led by fifth year head coach King Rice, played their home games at the Multipurpose Activity Center and were members of the Metro Atlantic Athletic Conference (MAAC). They finished the season 28–8, 17–3 in MAAC play to win the MAAC regular season championship. They defeated Rider and Fairfield to advance to the championship game of the MAAC tournament where they lost to Iona. As a regular season conference champion who failed to win their conference tournament, they received an automatic bid to the National Invitation Tournament. As one of the last four teams left out of the NCAA tournament, they received a #1 seed in the NIT where they defeated Bucknell in the first round to advance to the second round where they lost to George Washington.

This season is best known for Monmouth defeating five power conference opponents (UCLA, Notre Dame, USC, Georgetown, and Rutgers) and for the Hawks receiving votes in the AP poll for the first time ever.

Previous season 
The Hawks finished the 2014–15 season 18–15, 13–7 in MAAC play to finish in tie for third place. They lost in the quarterfinals of the MAAC tournament to Iona.

Roster

Schedule

|-
! colspan="9" style="background:#002245; color:#fff;"| Exhibition

|-
! colspan="9" style="background:#002245; color:#fff;"| Regular season

|-
! colspan="9" style="background:#002245; color:#fff;"| MAAC tournament

|-
! colspan="9" style="background:#002245; color:#fff;"| National Invitation tournament

Rankings

References

Monmouth Hawks men's basketball seasons
Monmouth
Monmouth